Undercover is a British television comedy drama series about a bumbling cop working undercover in an Armenian crime family.

References

External links
 
 
 

2015 British television series debuts
2015 British television series endings
2010s British comedy television series
2010s British crime television series
Dave (TV channel) original programming
English-language television shows